A suburb of Dayton, Washington Township is the largest of nine townships of Montgomery County, Ohio, United States. As of the 2010 census, the population was 56,607, with 32,610 persons residing within the unincorporated portion of the township, and 23,997 persons residing within the city of Centerville.

The township, through the independent Centerville-Washington Park District, contains eight community parks, nine nature parks and 33 neighborhood parks encompassing 1,000 acres in Centerville and Washington Township.

Geography

Located in the southeastern corner of the county, it borders the following townships and city:
Kettering - north
Sugarcreek Township, Greene County - east
Bellbrook - east
Wayne Township, Warren County - southeast
Clearcreek Township, Warren County - south
Miami Township - west
Springboro - southwest

Because most of eastern Montgomery County is urbanized, Washington Township is the only civil township in the county to border Greene County.

Several populated places are located in Washington Township:
Part of the city of Kettering, in the north
Part of the city of Centerville, in the center

Name and history
It is one of forty-three Washington Townships statewide.

In 1833, Washington Township contained four gristmills, seven saw mills, and one cotton factory.

Government

The township is governed by a three-member board of trustees who are elected in November of odd-numbered years to a four-year term beginning on the following January 1. Two are elected in the year after the presidential election and one is elected in the year before it. There is also an elected township fiscal officer who serves a four-year term beginning on April 1 of the year after the election, which is held in November of the year before the presidential election. Vacancies in the fiscal officership or on the board of trustees are filled by the remaining trustees.

Both the township's library system and the Centerville City School District (shared with residents of the city of Centerville) are ranked highly on state and national scales.

Police services are provided in the township through a contract with the Montgomery County Sheriff’s Office.

References

External links
 The Centerville-Washington Township Historical Society, Retrieved July 15, 2016
Township website
County website

Townships in Montgomery County, Ohio
Townships in Ohio